Panthères Noires Kigali was a football club from Kigali in Rwanda.

In 1980 the team has won the Rwandan Premier League.

Stadium
The team plays at the Stade Regional de Kigali.

Performance in CAF competitions
CAF Champions League: 1 appearance
1986 African Cup of Champions Clubs – First Round

Achievements
Rwandan Premier League  (5)
 1980, 1984, 1985, 1986, 1987

References

External links

Football clubs in Rwanda
Sport in Kigali
association football clubs established in 1965
association football clubs disestablished in 1989